"Don't Panic" is a song by the British rock band Coldplay. Originally titled "Panic", the earliest known version of the song existed in 1998, performed live during the band's first gig in the same year. It had a different melody, and was included in the band's third EP, The Blue Room. The track was reproduced by Coldplay and British producer Ken Nelson for the band's debut album, Parachutes.

Following their successful releases in 2000, Coldplay and their record label Parlophone thought there was enough exposure of the album in the United Kingdom. Thus, the decision of releasing a fourth single would be for regions that had not been overdosed by the hit singles "Yellow" and "Trouble". They settled on "Don't Panic", which at the time was an audience favourite. It was released in some European regions, and the United Kingdom only received a promo edition. The critical reception of the song was generally positive.

Origins and production 

"Don't Panic" came into existence while Coldplay was still in its infancy, written and composed by singer Chris Martin. In the time, the band had written 10 songs including an early version of "Don't Panic", and used it in recruiting the band's drummer. It was originally called "Panic", and was one of six songs played at Coldplay's first gig in 1998 at Camden's Laurel Tree. This version has a different melody, and the lyrics are an account of a "slightly disastrous evening Chris had spent entertaining a young lady called Alice Hill". Eventually, the title became "Don't Panic."

The original version of "Don't Panic" was recorded in 1999, different from the version featured in Parachutes. First, lead singer Chris Martin plays the piano during the bridge. As well, there is a feedback-distorted introduction. This version was included in The Blue Room EP, released in October 1999.

For Coldplay's debut album Parachutes (2000), British record producer Ken Nelson re-produced "Don't Panic". The track was recorded live, like many other tracks featured in the album. Guitarist Jonny Buckland recorded twice his overdubbed guitars, and used parts of the two during the mixing. The band subtly used the acoustic guitar, drums and bass, and also a pump organ. Buckland also provides vocals for the second verse of the song. The song was recorded in Rockfield Studios, Wales and Parr Street Studio, Liverpool.

"Don't Panic" is the opening track to Parachutes. A guitar-based song, it begins with strummed acoustic guitar riffs, then followed by the vocals of Chris Martin. A review claims that Coldplay's indie rock inclination is obvious in the song. The verse melody is similar to "Things" by Split Enz (1979).

Release and reception 

Originally, the band planned to release "Don't Panic" as Parachutes fourth single. However, it was abandoned after they deemed three singles were enough for an album. Following the successful single releases of the album in 2000, the band thought that Parachutes had gained enough exposure in significant regions in the United Kingdom. When they decided to release a fourth single, it would be for countries yet not "overdosed" by the hit singles "Yellow" and "Trouble". Coldplay and their record label, Parlophone, settled on "Don't Panic", which at the time was an audience favourite. The single was eventually released on 19 March 2001 in some European regions. The single is accompanied by the live tracks "You Only Live Twice", a theme song for the James Bond film of the same name, and "Bigger Stronger", a song taken from the band's first EP release; these live tracks were recorded during their performance at the Rockefeller Music Hall in Norway.

Like their other songs, Coldplay has refused several offers to use "Don't Panic" for promotional tools. In 2004, the band rejected a multi-million Euro offer from Diet Coke and Gap to use "Don't Panic" and "Trouble", another song featured in the album. The band asked then-manager Phil Harvey to not refer them to such offers because "a discussion might lead to compromise".

Despite this, the song has been used in many promotional tools and featured in several films and television series. In 2002, the song was featured in the comedy-drama film Igby Goes Down, and later appeared on the film's soundtrack album, released on 25 February 2003 by Spun Records. Also in 2003, the song was also featured on Coldplay's live album Live 2003. In 2004, it was on the romantic comedy film Garden State; director Zach Braff handpicked songs, including "Don't Panic", for the film's Grammy Award-winning compilation album, Garden State: Music From The Motion Picture. The song was also featured on the debut episode of the FX television series Rescue Me as well as the pilot episode of the short-lived show Odyssey 5. Additionally, the song was featured in episode nine of the first series on the British TV series Sugar Rush in 2005. On 19 July 2011, the song was played as a wake-up call to STS-135 Space Shuttle Atlantis Pilot Doug Hurley as a tribute from his wife and family, marking the last ever wake-up call for a crew visiting the International Space Station from the Space Shuttle fleet. It was also referenced in the 2016 movie The 5th Wave as a lullaby to the main character's little brother. In February 2016, a cover of the song by Clairity was used in the trailer for the 2016 film X-Men: Apocalypse, as well as the film's TV spot for the Super Bowl 50. This same cover was used in the seventh season finale of The CW series The Vampire Diaries ("Gods and Monsters").

During the band's 2003 A Rush of Blood to the Head Tour, "Don't Panic" contained an entirely different introduction. In addition, Martin played the electric guitar and Buckland in harmonica solo during the bridge. He regularly threw the harmonica into the crowd after the solo. In 2001, a dance cover version of "Don't Panic" was released by Logo featuring Dawn Joseph.

During performances of "Don't Panic", Martin would stop the song after Buckland performs his verse and make him perform it a second time. Buckland jokingly stated in an interview with Business Times that he wanted the practice dropped, saying, "I don't think I would dread it so much if he didn't (sometimes) make me do it twice." Performances during 2017 legs of A Head Full of Dreams Tour would feature drummer Will Champion as lead vocalist.

Critical reviews 
Upon release, critics gave the song generally positive reviews. MacKenzie Wilson, in his review from Allmusic, notes, "Coldplay's indie rock inclinations are also obvious, especially on songs such as 'Don't Panic' and 'Shiver'." In the Pitchfork Media review, Spencer Owen writes, "This subdued, dreamy opener contains Martin's falsetto chorus of 'We live in a beautiful world,' which seems to sum up the overall sentiment of the record." Robert Christgau alleged that, along with "Yellow", the song was one of only two good ones on all of Parachutes. Critic Adrian Denning, in his review of the album, compliments, "Both the vocals and guitar are utterly beautiful. It's a song to take solace from, draw comfort from, be quietly awed by." David DeVoe of Hybridmagazine.com wrote: "It is a wonderful song that echoes the promise of what is to come on the rest of the record. 'Don't Panic' is filled with excellent guitar tones and a nice grooving back beat, and I love the way the song ends."

Music video 
The music video for "Don't Panic" was directed by Tim Hope. The video starts off with an animated diagram of the water cycle, then portrays the band as two-dimensional paper cutouts doing household chores, when suddenly disaster strikes the earth in the forms of floods, volcanoes and electric shocks. Like the music video for Shiver, "Don't Panic" also features the yellow globe on the cover of Parachutes.

Track listing 

Main single
 "Don't Panic" – 2:20
 "You Only Live Twice" (live from Norway) – 4:06
 "Bigger Stronger" (live from Norway) – 4:55

Denmark version
 "Don't Panic" – 2:19
 "Trouble" (live Fra Vega I Danmark) – 4:36
 "Shiver" (live Fra Vega I Danmark) – 5:25
 "Sparks" (live Fra Vega I Danmark) – 4:05

Netherlands version
 "Don't Panic" – 2:20
 "Spies" (live at Lowlands 2000) – 6:12
 "Bigger Stronger" (live at Lowlands 2000) – 4:51
 "Yellow" (live at Lowlands 2000) – 4:32

French version
 "Don't Panic" - 2:20
 "You Only Live Twice" (live from Norway) – 4:08
 "Don't Panic" (OUI FM Session Acoustique 102.3 FM) - 2:33

Credits and personnel 
 Chris Martin - lead vocals, acoustic guitar, piano
 Jonny Buckland - lead guitar, vocals, slide guitar
 Guy Berryman - bass guitar
 Will Champion - drums, shaker

Charts

Certifications

References

External links 
 

1999 songs
2001 singles
Coldplay songs
Parlophone singles
Song recordings produced by Ken Nelson (British record producer)
Songs written by Chris Martin
Songs written by Guy Berryman
Songs written by Jonny Buckland
Songs written by Will Champion